Billel Bensaha (born 18 February 1994) is an Algerian footballer who plays as a winger for Al-Sharq.

Career
In 2019, he signed a contract with ES Tunis.
In 2020, he signed a loan contract with MC Alger.
In 2021, he joined JS Kabylie.
In 2023, he joined Al-Sharq.

Honours

Club 
Espérance de Tunis

 Tunisian Ligue Professionnelle 1 (1): 2019–20
 Tunisian Super Cup  (1): 2020
 Tunisian Cup  : Runners-up 2019–20
 CAF Super Cup:  Runners-up 2020

References

External links

1994 births
Living people
Algerian footballers
Algerian expatriate footballers
Association football wingers
JSM Béjaïa players
DRB Tadjenanet players
Espérance Sportive de Tunis players
Al-Sharq Club players
Tunisian Ligue Professionnelle 1 players
Algerian Ligue Professionnelle 1 players
Saudi Second Division players
Algerian expatriate sportspeople in Tunisia
Expatriate footballers in Tunisia
Algerian expatriate sportspeople in Saudi Arabia
Expatriate footballers in Saudi Arabia
21st-century Algerian people